Guy of Poitiers-Lusignan (1275/1280–1303) was constable of Cyprus from 1298. He was the youngest son of Hugh III of Cyprus (ruled in 1267–1284) and Isabella of Ibelin.

He married Eschiva of Ibelin, Lady of Beirut. Their children were:
 Hugh IV, king of Cyprus (1324–1358)
 Isabel (1296/1300 – after 1340), married in 1322 to Eudes de Dampierre, constable of Jerusalem.

References

House of Poitiers-Lusignan
People of the Kingdom of Cyprus